Kalam Marindi is a 1972 Indian Telugu-language film directed by K. Viswanath and produced by Bommisetty, Hanumantha Rao & Vasiraju Prakasam. The story is based on the concept of untouchability and casteism and is dedicated to Mahatma Gandhi.

Cast
 Gummadi as Lakshmipati
 Anjali Devi
 Sobhan Babu as Srinivas
 Sarada as Shanti
 Rao Gopala Rao as Koteshu
 Chandra Mohan as Krishnavatharam
Potti Prasad
 Suryakantam as Srinivas' grandmother
 Sakshi Ranga Rao as Seshavatharam
 Pushpa Kumari as Thayaru
Geetanjali as Geetha
Raavi Kondala Rao
Allu Ramalingaiah as MLA Ekambareshwar Rao
Nirmalamma as Shanti's aunt
Devadas Kanakala
 Chalapathi Rao as Doctor
K.V. Chalam
P. J. Sarma as Doctor

Songs
"Emitayya Sarasalu" (Lyrics: Kosaraju Raghavaiah)
"Mundarunna Chinnadani" (Lyrics: Daasarathi Krishnamacharyulu)
"Sannajaji Sogasundi" (Lyrics: C. Narayana Reddy)
"Nijam Telugusukondi O YuvakullarA" (Lyrics: Dasarathi Krishnamacharyulu)
"Om Namo Narayanaya" (Lyrics: Devulapalli Krishnasastri)
"Palle Nidurinchenu" (Lyrics: Dasaradhi Krishnamacharyulu)
"Ee Thalli Padenu Jola" (Lyrics: Devulapalli Krishnasastri)
"Maraledhule Eekalam" (Lyrics: Dasarathi Krishnamacharyulu)

Awards
 Vasiraju Prakasam won the Nandi Award for Best Feature Film - Gold in 1972.

References

External links
Kalam Marindi at IMDb.

Films directed by K. Viswanath
1972 films
Indian black-and-white films
Films about the caste system in India
1970s Telugu-language films